The Spaniard's Curse is a 1958 British thriller film directed by Ralph Kemplen and starring Tony Wright, Lee Patterson, Michael Hordern, Susan Beaumont and Henry Oscar. It was shot at Walton Studios near London with sets designed by the art director Anthony Masters. It is based on the novella The Assize Of The Dying by Edith Pargeter.

Plot
Guy Stevenson is a British man of Spanish heritage, in poor health and on trial for the murder of an actress called Zoe Trevor. He is convicted and given the death sentence. He protests his innocence and places a curse on the trial judge, Justice Manton; the prosecuting counsel, Sir Robert Wyvern; the foreman of the jury; and the real murderer.  The curse is a summons to attend the 'Assize of the Dying'. Watching the proceedings from the court gallery are Justice Manton's ward, Margaret, his son Charlie, and Zoe Trevor's half-brother, Mark Brett. Charlie is covering the case as a newspaper reporter. We learn that he is a much decorated ex-RAF officer and gambler. After the trial, Margaret makes the acquaintance of Mark Brett, and tells him of her doubts of Stevenson's guilt. Mark seems to have arrived from abroad and claims never to have met his half-sister.   They are attracted to each other and decide to re-examine the case. The foreman of the jury is killed in a road accident in front of them immediately afterwards. Stevenson dies of a heart condition before his sentence can be carried out and evidence is later discovered that appears to exonerate him. Margaret and Mark continue their investigation, with occasional interventions from Charlie, who also seems to have romantic feelings towards Margaret, as the curse works itself out.

Cast
 Tony Wright as Charlie Manton
 Lee Patterson as Mark Brett
 Michael Hordern as Mr Justice Manton
 Susan Beaumont as Margaret Manton
 Ralph Truman as Sir Robert Wyvern
 Henry Oscar as Mr Fredericks
 Brian Oulton as Frank Porter
 Olga Dickie as Hannah  
 Roddy Hughes as Arthur Jody  
 Joe Gibbons as Foreman  
 Evelyn Roberts as Colonel Judkin
 Jessica Cairns as Adriana
 Constance Fraser as Mrs Brooks
 Basil Dignam as Guy Stevenson

Critical reception
TV Guide called the film "an interesting murder mystery but one which never really delivers what it promises." The Radio Times wrote, "Tony Wright has the most colourful part as the judge's wayward son, a crime reporter, but Michael Hordern as the judge gives the sharpest performance. It's the only film directed by top editor Ralph Kemplen, who wisely returned to his real talent, cutting Room at the Top, Oliver! and others".

References

External links

1958 films
1950s thriller films
British thriller films
Films shot at Nettlefold Studios
1950s English-language films
1950s British films